Surma may refer to:

 Surma (Finnish mythology), a beast which guards the gates of the Underworld
 Surma people, a pastoralist ethnic group in western Ethiopia
 Surma (woreda), a district in the Southern Nations, Nationalities, and Peoples' Region, Ethiopia
 Surma River, a river in Sylhet, Bangladesh
 Surma, Nepal
 Surma, Tripura, an assembly constituency within the Tripura East (Lok Sabha constituency), India
 Kohl (cosmetics), an eyelash dye and eye cosmetic
 Surma-horn, a Ukrainian musical instrument
 Soorma (film), 2018 Indian film by Shaad Ali, based on the life of hockey player Sandeep Singh

Persons
 Surma D'Bait Mar Shimun (1883–1975), an Assyrian leader.
 Damian Surma (1981- ), Canadian ice hockey player;
 John P. Surma (1954- ), American businessman;
 Franciszek Surma (1916–1941), Polish pilot in World War II;
 Łukasz Surma (1977- ), Polish footballer;